Prior to its uniform adoption of proportional representation in 1999, the United Kingdom used first-past-the-post for the European elections in England, Scotland and Wales. The European Parliament constituencies used under that system were smaller than the later regional constituencies and only had one Member of the European Parliament each.

The constituency of London West was one of them.

When it was created in England in 1979, it consisted of the Westminster Parliament constituencies of Acton, Brentford and Isleworth, Ealing North, Feltham and Heston, Hayes and Harlington, Ruislip-Northwood, Southall and Uxbridge.

United Kingdom Parliamentary constituencies were redrawn in 1983 and the European constituencies were altered in 1984 to reflect this. The revised seat comprised the following Westminster constituencies: Brentford and Isleworth, Ealing Acton, Ealing North, Ealing Southall, Feltham and Heston, Hammersmith, Richmond and Barnes and Twickenham. The same boundaries were used in 1989 and 1994.

Results

References

West
20th century in London
1979 establishments in England
1999 disestablishments in England
Constituencies established in 1979
Constituencies disestablished in 1999